Joseph "Jack" Doyle (31 August 1913 – 13 December 1978), known as "The Gorgeous Gael", was an Irish boxer, actor, and a tenor. He was born Joseph Doyle (Joe to his friends) but changed to Jack when starting his professional career. At one time or another, Doyle was a contender for the British Boxing Championship.

Early years
Doyle was born into a working-class family in Cobh, in County Cork, Ireland in 1913. At six feet five inches, he was good with his fists and in 1929, joined the Irish Guards regiment of the British Army based in Wales.

There he excelled at boxing and was famed for his strong hooks that won him the British Army Championship. A record of 28 straight victories, 27 by knockout, brought him to the attention of promoter Dan Sullivan. He turned professional and notched up 10 consecutive victories, all inside two rounds, making him the hottest thing in the sport.

In July 1933, at the age of 19, he missed out on the British Heavyweight title to the holder, Welshman, Jack Petersen. Witnesses claim that he had done most of his warming up in a pub not far from the bout. Within the opening seconds he knew he was in trouble and decided to take the easy way out. He was disqualified for repeatedly punching low.

Shortly after, his singing voice was discovered by Dr. Vincent O'Brien, voice coach to Count John McCormack and soon his soft tenor voice and handsome looks were selling out the London Palladium and the Royal in Dublin. Doyle was subsequently signed up by Decca.

In 1934, Doyle travelled to the United States and several 78rpm records were produced including the popular "South of the Border" a duet recorded with his then wife Movita. But his love for the drink and generous nature soon started to take its toll on his health.

America
In America he carried on his high living of gambling, women and drink. His good looks and deep pockets opened up the party circuit to him and he starred in two movies, McGlusky the Sea Rover (UK, 1934) and Navy Spy (1937). Later in life he had minor parts in a number of British films.

While in the United States he continued to box, taking on Buddy Baer in August 1935. As in his fight against Petersen, it is said that Doyle had consumed the best part of a bottle of brandy before the bell rang and was in no fit state to stand. He was knocked down in the first round. It was around this time that Doyle and Judith Allen, who had been the girlfriend of Buddy Baer's younger brother and fellow boxer Max, had a whirlwind affair and married on 28 April 1935. Their marriage did not last. By the late 1930s Doyle was involved with the actress Movita Castaneda.

Return to Ireland

Following a celebrity wedding to Movita in Dublin's Westland Row Church they toured both sides of the Irish Sea, selling out music halls and opera houses.

Around this time Jack fought his last professional fight, against a journeyman called Chris Cole in front of 23,000 in Dalymount Park, Dublin. Arriving late for the bout after a stop at The Clarence Hotel for refreshments, the inebriated Doyle went down in the first. Movita packed up and moved back to Hollywood, where she went on to marry Marlon Brando.

Shortly after, Doyle found himself in Mountjoy Jail, Dublin for knocking out a Garda Detective in a Ranelagh pub. He moved to England and his spiral downwards into alcoholism and bankruptcy continued. He found his friends had deserted him as fast as his bank balance, spent in his own words on "slow horses and fast women". He odd-jobbed for a while but when he couldn't afford the rent on his flat, he took to sleeping at the homes of friends, in Pimlico, London. His only source of income during this time was an allowance he received from Movita.

In 1947 Doyle was imprisoned in Sligo Gaol for issuing a cheque which later bounced. He served four months of hard labour.

He died in 1978 at St. Mary's Hospital in Paddington, from cirrhosis of the liver. At the time it seemed he would be buried in a pauper's grave in London. However, when news of his death reached Ireland a number of members of the Cork Ex-Boxer's association decided to act. In conjunction with Cobh undertaker Paddy Barry they brought Jack's remains home. Large crowds lined the streets of Cobh as the coffin led by a lone piper and topped with Jack's trademark - a red carnation - was brought on its last journey. He was buried in the Old Church Cemetery, an ancient cemetery on the outskirts of the town of Cobh, County Cork, Ireland, and his grave is visited by thousands of people every year.

Shortly before his death, he was interviewed by a journalist who asked him if he had any regrets about not spending his money more wisely. "None at all," he said, "twas never a generous man went to hell."

Song about Doyle
The popular Irish song The Contender written by Jimmy MacCarthy around 1983 was a song about Jack Doyle., and performed by many including Finbar Wright, Christy Moore, Tommy Fleming and Paul McGrath (footballer)

Legacy
RTÉ, the Irish broadcaster, featured Jack Doyle in their series True Lives in a programme called Jack Doyle, a Legend Lost in September 2007. A book to accompany the programme called Jack Doyle: The Gorgeous Gael  was released in late 2007.

Filmography

References

External links

 HEAVYWEIGHT CROONERS - Boxers who croon? 1935
 

1913 births
1978 deaths
Irish male film actors
Irish Guards soldiers
People from Cobh
Irish soldiers in the British Army
20th-century Irish male actors
20th-century Irish male singers
Irish male boxers
Irish tenors
Heavyweight boxers